Potassium bromide (KBr) is a salt, widely used as an anticonvulsant and a sedative in the late 19th and early 20th centuries, with over-the-counter use extending to 1975 in the US. Its action is due to the bromide ion (sodium bromide is equally effective). Potassium bromide is used as a veterinary drug, as an antiepileptic medication for dogs.

Under standard conditions, potassium bromide is a white crystalline powder. It is freely soluble in water; it is not soluble in acetonitrile. In a dilute aqueous solution, potassium bromide tastes sweet, at higher concentrations it tastes bitter, and tastes salty when the concentration is even higher. These effects are mainly due to the properties of the potassium ion—sodium bromide tastes salty at any concentration. In high concentration, potassium bromide strongly irritates the gastric mucous membrane, causing nausea and sometimes vomiting (a typical effect of all soluble potassium salts).

Chemical properties
Potassium bromide, a typical ionic salt, is fully dissociated and near pH 7 in aqueous solution. It serves as a source of bromide ions. This reaction is important for the manufacture of silver bromide for photographic film:

KBr_{(aq)}{} + AgNO3_{(aq)} -> AgBr_{(s)}{} + KNO3_{(aq)}

Aqueous bromide  also forms complexes when reacted with some metal halides such as copper(II) bromide:

2 KBr_{(aq)}{} + CuBr2_{(aq)} -> K2[CuBr3]_{(aq)}

Preparation
A traditional method for the manufacture of KBr is the reaction of potassium carbonate with an iron(III, II) bromide, made by treating scrap iron under water with excess bromine:

4 K2CO3 + Fe3Br8 -> 8 KBr + Fe3O4 + 4 CO2

Applications

Medical and veterinary

The anticonvulsant properties of potassium bromide were first noted by Sir Charles Locock at a meeting of the Royal Medical and Chirurgical Society in 1857. Bromide can be regarded as the first effective medication for epilepsy. At the time, it was commonly thought that epilepsy was caused by masturbation. Locock noted that bromide calmed sexual excitement and thought this was responsible for his success in treating seizures. In the latter half of the 19th century, potassium bromide was used for the calming of seizure and nervous disorders on an enormous scale, with the use by single hospitals being as much as several tons a year (the dose for a given person being a few grams per day). By the beginning of the 20th century the generic word had become so widely associated with being sedate that bromide came to mean a dull, sedate person or a boring platitude uttered by such a person.

There was not a better epilepsy drug until phenobarbital in 1912.  The British Army has historically been claimed to lace soldiers' tea with bromide to quell sexual arousal but that is likely untrue as doing so would also diminish alertness in battle.  Several other substances have also been named in anaphrodisiac myths.

Bromide compounds, especially sodium bromide, remained in over-the-counter sedatives and headache remedies (such as the original formulation of Bromo-Seltzer) in the US until 1975, when bromides were outlawed in all over-the-counter medicines, due to chronic toxicity. Bromide's exceedingly long half life in the body made it difficult to dose without side effects. Medical use of bromides in the US was discontinued at this time, as many better and shorter-acting sedatives were known by then.

Potassium bromide is used in veterinary medicine to treat epilepsy in dogs, either as first-line treatment or in addition to phenobarbital, when seizures are not adequately controlled with phenobarbital alone. Use of bromide in cats is limited because it carries a substantial risk of causing lung inflammation (pneumonitis) in them. The use of bromide as a treatment drug for animals means that veterinary medical diagnostic laboratories are able as a matter of routine to measure serum levels of bromide on order of a veterinarian, whereas human medical diagnostic labs in the US do not measure bromide as a routine test.

Potassium bromide is not approved by the US Food and Drug Administration (FDA) for use in humans to control seizures. In Germany, it is still approved as an antiepileptic drug for humans, particularly children and adolescents. These indications include severe forms of generalized tonic-clonic seizures, early-childhood-related tonic–clonic seizures, and also severe myoclonic seizures during childhood. Adults who have reacted positively to the drug during childhood/adolescence may continue treatment. Potassium bromide tablets are sold under the brand name Dibro-Be mono (Rx-only). The drug has almost complete bioavailability, but the bromide ion has a relatively long half life of 12 days in the blood, making bromide salts difficult to adjust and dose. Bromide is not known to interfere with the absorption or excretion of any other anticonvulsant, though it does have strong interactions with chloride in the body, the normal body uptake and excretion of which strongly influences bromide's excretion.

The therapeutic index (ratio of effectiveness to toxicity) for bromide is small. As with other antiepileptics, sometimes even therapeutic doses (3 to 5 grams per day, taking 6 to 8 weeks to reach stable levels) may give rise to intoxication. Often indistinguishable from 'expected' side-effects, these include:

Bromism These are central nervous system reactions. They may include:
depression,
lethargy, somnolence (from daytime sleepiness to coma)
loss of appetite and cachexia, nausea/emesis with exicosis (loss of body fluid)
loss of reflexes or pathologic reflexes
clonic seizures
tremor
ataxia
loss of neural sensitivity
paresis
cerebral edema with associated headache and papilledema of the eyes
delirium: confusion, abnormal speech, loss of concentration and memory, aggressiveness
psychosis

Acne-form dermatitis and other forms of skin disease may also be seen, as well as mucous hypersecretion in the lungs. Asthma and rhinitis may worsen. Rarely, tongue disorder, aphthous stomatitis, bad breath, and constipation occur.

Optics
Potassium bromide is transparent from the near ultraviolet to long-wave infrared wavelengths (0.25-25 µm) and has no significant optical absorption lines in its high transmission region.
It is used widely as infrared optical windows and components for general spectroscopy because of its wide spectral range. In infrared spectroscopy, samples are analyzed by grinding with powdered potassium bromide and pressing into a disc. Alternatively, samples may be analyzed as a liquid film (neat, as a solution, or in a mull with Nujol) between two polished potassium bromide discs.

Due to its high solubility and hygroscopic nature it must be kept in a dry environment. The refractive index is about 1.55 at 1.0 µm.

Photography
In addition to manufacture of silver bromide, potassium bromide is used as a restrainer in black and white developer formulas. It improves differentiation between exposed and unexposed crystals of silver halide, and thus reduces fog.

References

External links

 Veterinary use note at Auburn University

Potassium compounds
Bromides
Sedatives
Anticonvulsants
Pesticides
Optical materials
Photographic chemicals
Metal halides
GABAA receptor positive allosteric modulators
Alkali metal bromides
Rock salt crystal structure